The 1996 International ÖTV Raiffeisen Grand Prix was a men's tennis tournament played on outdoor clay courts in Sankt Pölten in Austria and was part of the World Series of the 1996 ATP Tour. It was the 16th edition of the tournament and ran from 20 May until 26 May 1996. Second-seeded Marcelo Ríos won the singles title.

Finals

Singles

 Marcelo Ríos defeated  Félix Mantilla 6–2, 6–4
 It was Ríos' only singles title of the year and the 4th of his career.

Doubles

 Ctislav Doseděl /  Pavel Vízner defeated  David Adams /  Menno Oosting 6–7, 6–4, 6–3
 It was Doseděl's 2nd title of the year and the 3rd of his career. It was Vízner's 1st title of the year and the 1st of his career.

References

External links
 ITF tournament edition details

International OTV Raiffeisen Grand Prix
Hypo Group Tennis International
International OTV Raiffeisen Grand Prix
Hypo